Lee Yuan-chuan (born 20 May 1944) is a Taiwanese politician.

Lee was a party list member of the Legislative Yuan from 1993 to 1996, and represented the Kuomintang. Between 2009 and 2016, Lee headed the Taiwan Provincial Consultative Council.

References

Party List Members of the Legislative Yuan
Living people
Members of the 2nd Legislative Yuan
Kuomintang Members of the Legislative Yuan in Taiwan
21st-century Taiwanese politicians
Politicians of the Republic of China on Taiwan from Kaohsiung
1944 births